"Johnny & June" is the solo debut song co-written and recorded by American country music singer Heidi Newfield, the former lead singer of the group Trick Pony.  It was released in March 2008 as the first single from her debut album What Am I Waiting For, which was released in August 2008 on Curb Records. The song reached a peak of #11 on the Hot Country Songs charts in late September 2008, becoming Newfield's only solo Top 20 Country hit to date.

Content
"Johnny & June" is a ballad that was written by Heidi Newfield alongside Deanna Bryant and Stephony Smith. The song features a female narrator who describes the kind of relationship that she wishes to have with her lover — specifically, one comparable to the relationship between singer Johnny Cash and his wife, June Carter Cash.

Critical reception
In his review of the album, Matt C. of Engine 145, noted that the song "sounds good against the rest of the album" but also said that it "is diminished by its association with the recent explosion of lesser name-checking songs."

Music video
A music video, directed by Eric Welch, was released in August 2008. The video begins with Newfield wearing a white dress, as she performs on stage inside an empty auditorium. She is then shown sitting on the hood of a black Cadillac. During the chorus, she is surrounded by flames while dressed in black, a reference to Cash's "Ring of Fire".

Personnel
The following musicians perform on this track.
Dan Dugmore – steel guitar
Kenny Greenberg – electric guitar
Wes Hightower – background vocals
Greg Morrow – drums
Steve Nathan – piano
Stephony Smith – background vocals
Ilya Toshinsky – acoustic guitar
Glenn Worf – bass guitar
Reese Wynans – Hammond B-3 organ
Jonathan Yudkin – cello

Chart performance
"Johnny & June" debuted at number 46 on the Billboard Hot Country Songs chart for the chart week of April 19, 2008. The song spent 27 weeks on the country charts, eventually peaking at number 11 on September 27, 2008. The song also crossed over to pop charts, peaking at number 58 on the Hot 100 chart. The song has sold 862,000 copies in the US as of May 2016.

Year-end charts

References

2008 debut singles
2008 songs
Heidi Newfield songs
Song recordings produced by Tony Brown (record producer)
Songs written by Heidi Newfield
Curb Records singles
Songs written by Stephony Smith
Songs written by Deanna Bryant
Songs about musicians
Cultural depictions of Johnny Cash